Callianassa is a genus of mud shrimps, in the family Callianassidae. Three of the species in this genus (C. candida, C. tyrrhena and C. whitei) have been split off into a new genus, Pestarella, while others such as Callianassa filholi have been moved to Biffarius.

Species
Forty-six species are currently recognised in the genus Callianassa:

Callianassa acutirostella Sakai, 1988
Callianassa affinis A. Milne-Edwards, 1861
Callianassa amplimaxilla Sakai, 2002
Callianassa anoploura Sakai, 2002
Callianassa aqabaensis Dworschak, 2003
Callianassa australis Kensley, 1974
Callianassa bangensis Sakai, 2005
Callianassa batei Woodward, 1869
Callianassa brachytelson Sakai, 2002
Callianassa brevirostris Sakai, 2002
Callianassa chakratongae Sakai, 2002
Callianassa contipes Sakai, 2002
Callianassa costaricensis Sakai, 2005
Callianassa diaphora Le Loeuff & Intes, 1974
Callianassa exilimaxilla Sakai, 2005
Callianassa gravieri Nobili, 1905
Callianassa gruneri Sakai, 1999
Callianassa intermedia De Man, 1905
Callianassa joculatrix De Man, 1905
Callianassa japonica Ortmann, 1892
Callianassa lignicola Alcock & Anderson, 1899
Callianassa limosa Poore, 1975
Callianassa lobetobensis De Man, 1905
Callianassa longicauda Sakai, 1967
Callianassa malaccaensis Sakai, 2002
Callianassa marchali Le Loeuff & Intes, 1974
Callianassa matzi Sakai, 2002
Callianassa mocambiquensis Sakai, 2004
Callianassa modesta De Man, 1905
Callianassa nieli Sakai, 2002
Callianassa nigroculata Sakai, 2002
Callianassa parva Edmondson, 1944
Callianassa parvula Sakai, 1988
Callianassa persica Sakai, 2005
Callianassa plantei Sakai, 2004
Callianassa propriopedis Sakai, 2002
Callianassa pugnatrix De Man, 1905
Callianassa pygmaea De Man, 1928
Callianassa rathbunae Glaessner, 1929
Callianassa sahul Poore, 2008
Callianassa spinoculata Sakai, 2005
Callianassa stenomastaxa Sakai, 2002
Callianassa subterranea (Montagu, 1808)
Callianassa tabogensis Sakai, 2005
Callianassa tenuipes Sakai, 2002
Callianassa thailandica Sakai, 2005
Callianassa thorsoni Sakai, 2005

Several species are known from the fossil record, including:
 †Callianassa elegans Bohm 1922 (Java)

References

Thalassinidea
Decapod genera